Vredenburgites is a genus of ceratitids in the family Trachyceratidae.  Its shell has numerous, thin, flexious ribs.

Related genera include Anasirenites, Sirenites, and Wangoceras.

References 

 Arkell, et al., Mesozoic Ammonoidea, Treatise on Invertebrate Paleontology, Part L, Mollusca 4, Geological Society of America. 1957.
 Sirentitinae at Paleodb

Trachyceratidae
Ceratitida genera
Triassic ammonites